Gordon Ng Ching-hang (born 9 September 1978), also known under the pseudonym Lee Bak Lou, is a Hong Kong pro-democracy activist. Ng, the only nonpartisan defendant of the Hong Kong 47, is charged and now detained under the national security law for conspiracy to commit subversion.

Career 
After graduating from an Australian university, Ng had worked in investment companies between 2009 and 2016, much related to hedge fund.

In 2016, he became a volunteer of ThunderGo, a strategic electoral plan proposed by legal scholar Benny Tai.

Without any prior electoral and political experiences, Ng initiated the petition "Say No to Primary Dodgers" in the run-up of the 2020 pro-democracy primaries, hoping the pro-democracy camp would unite and secure a majority in the Legislative Council after the legislative election. Helping Tai to formulate the plan for the primaries, Ng also published a front-page advertisement on Apple Daily and wrote to politicians to gather support for his initiative.

With the conclusion of the primaries, Ng continued his political activism under the name of "Legco Petition".

Arrest 
Ng was arrested on 6 January 2021 by the national security police for organising the primaries on suspicion of "subversion of state power". Although released on police bail, he, along with 46 others which would collectively be known as Hong Kong 47, was re-arrested on 28 February, and charged with conspiracy to commit subversion of the state power. He has since been remanded in custody after his bail applications were turned down by court. Ng is also the only defendant reserving the 8-day bail review rights, and requesting a committal proceedings to review whether he could be transferred to High Court.

According to the Australian Government, Australian officials were repeatedly refused consular access to an Australian-Chinese dual national because Hong Kong no longer recognised dual citizenship. Local media later identified Ng as the person concerned.

Ng is the only organiser not pleading guilty to the charge, which carries the maximum penalty of life imprisonment for "principal offender" or those committing "an offence of a grave nature". Ng believed he could be locked up in prison for 20 years, citing multiple concerns and factors including the reaction from the Australian Government.

In the trial, Ng was accused by the prosecution to be a supporter of Tai and that his voting strategy "formed the backbone of the primary election" for making the primaries binding.

Notes

References 

Hong Kong pan-democrats
1978 births
Living people